Patriarch Leontius may refer to:

Leontius I of Jerusalem, Patriarch of Jerusalem in 911–928
Leontius of Bulgaria, Patriarch of Bulgaria c. 918–c. 927
Leontius of Alexandria, Greek Patriarch of Alexandria in 1052–1059
Leontius of Constantinople, Ecumenical Patriarch of Constantinople in 1189